WWNR (620 AM) is a news/talk/sports formatted broadcast radio station licensed to Beckley, West Virginia, serving Beckley and Oak Hill in West Virginia.  WWNR is owned and operated by Southern Communications.

WWNR began broadcasting in 1946 on 1450 kHz. It was an affiliate of the Mutual Broadcasting System. In 1951 the station changed its frequency to 620 kHz and increased its power output.

WWNR is currently using a 250-watt translator on 101.1 FM. The transmitter site is on Sullivan Hill south of Beckley.

External links
 WWNR News-Talk 620 Online
 History of WWNR

 

WNR
Raleigh County, West Virginia
Radio stations established in 1946
1946 establishments in West Virginia